Sault Ste. Marie is a cross-border region of Canada and the United States located on St. Marys River, which drains Lake Superior into Lake Huron. Founded as a single settlement in 1668, Sault Ste. Marie was divided in 1817 by the establishment of the Canada–US border in the area. The region is a traditional territory of the Ojibwe.

The region takes its name from the St. Marys Rapids, which lie just downstream of the exit of St. Marys River's from Lake Superior.  Ships may bypass the rapids via the Soo Locks, on the American side of the river, or the smaller Sault Ste. Marie Canal, on the Canadian side.

Settlements after the divide are Sault Ste. Marie, Ontario (pop. 72,051 as of 2021), a city in Canada, and Sault Ste. Marie, Michigan (population 13,337 as of 2020), a city in the United States.

Sault Ste. Marie
Cross-border regions